KCLE (1460 kHz) is a commercial AM radio station licensed to Burleson, Texas which serves the Dallas–Fort Worth metroplex. It is owned by Tron Dinh Do, through licensee Intelli, LLC., and broadcasts Vietnamese language music and talk from a network based in California. First licensed in July 1922, it is one of Texas' oldest radio stations.

KCLE programming is also heard on two FM translator stations:  93.1 K226BM in Cleburne and 95.7 K239CC in Burleson.

History

KCLE was first licensed, with the sequentially assigned call letters of WJAD, to Jackson's Radio Engineering Laboratories in Waco, Texas on July 21, 1922. The call letters were changed to WACO in February 1930. WACO was owned by three men, Frank P. Jackson, J. M. Gilliam, and Orville Bullington of Wichita Falls, the 1932 Republican gubernatorial nominee.

In 1962, it put an FM station on the air, 99.9 WACO-FM.  The two stations simulcast a country music format.  In the late 1970s and for most of the 1980s, the FM station switched to an easy listening/middle of the road music format as KHOO, while the AM station continued as country outlet WACO.  The FM station came back to country music in 1990, returning to its WACO-FM call sign, while the AM station was rebranded as KKTK in 1996.

In 2002, Lee Glascow sold the station for $405,000.  It became a joint venture between M&M Broadcasters (80%) and George Marti (20%). The owners changed the station’s call sign to KTFW as a simulcast of its sister station 92.1 KTFW-FM in Glen Rose, Texas, which broadcast a country format.

In 2005, the station and its city of license were moved to Burleson, Texas, in the larger Dallas-Fort Worth radio market.  The call letters were switched to KHFX.  It began carrying Fox Sports Radio programming after the network's previous Dallas affiliate, 1190 KFXR, switched to classic country music.  George Marti sold the remaining shares to M&M that same year.  Eventually the station switched its call letters to KCLE, flipping its format to classic country music.

On April 14, 2009, KCLE lost its fight with the Federal Communications Commission (FCC) to keep AM 1480 KNIT (now KNGO) from increasing its daytime power to 50,000 watts.  KCLE feared the high powered station, only 20 kHz away, would drown out 1460 KCLE for some listeners close to KNIT's transmitter.

It was announced on July 23, 2013, that KCLE would jettison its classic country format and become a second ESPN Radio Network affiliate in the Dallas/Fort Worth area by June 24. The station's schedule would complement KESN ESPN 103.3, which serves the Metroplex from its tower north of Dallas, while KCLE's transmitter is south of Fort Worth.  While KESN carried Mike & Mike in the Morning and the first two hours of Colin Cowherd, KCLE would air a local sports talk morning show from 6 to 9 a.m. and continue its long-running "DFW Tradefair" tradio program from 9 to 11 a.m. After KESN shifted to local programming at 11 a.m., KCLE would pick up the network programming.

On February 25, 2015, Intelli, LLC closed on its purchase of KCLE from M&M Broadcasters for $1.6 million.

KCLE went off the air in July 2016. The station returned to the air in late June 2017, airing Vietnamese music and talk.

References

External links
 DFW Radio/TV History

FCC History Cards for KCLE (covering WJAD / WACO from 1927-1980)

Radio stations established in 1922
CLE
1922 establishments in Texas
Radio stations licensed before 1923 and still broadcasting
CLE